The Clarkson Golden Knights women's ice hockey program represented Clarkson University during the
2011–12 NCAA women's ice hockey season. The Golden Knights secured their eighth consecutive appearance in the ECAC playoffs, but failed to qualify for their second NCAA tournament. The senior class consisted of Juana Baribeau, Katelyn Ptolemy, Gabrielle Kosziwka, Danielle Boudreau, Kali Gillanders and Brittany Mulligan.

Recruiting

Schedule

|-
!colspan=12 style=""| Regular Season

|-
!colspan=12 style=""| ECAC Hockey Tournament

Awards and honors

 Juana Baribeau – ECAC Hockey Player of the Week (1/31), ECAC Hockey weekly Honor Roll (11/14)
 Danielle Boudreau – ECAC Hockey Best Defensive Defenseman finalist
 Erica Howe – ECAC Hockey Goaltender of the Year, ECAC Hockey First Team All-Star, ECAC Hockey Player of the Year finalist, ECAC Hockey Goaltender of the Month (October, November), ECAC Hockey Goaltender of the Week (10/18, 10/25, 11/14), ECAC Hockey weekly Honor Roll (10/11, 11/1, 11/22, 12/5, 12/12, 1/16, 1/31, 2/7, 2/13, 2/20)
 Gabrielle Kosziwka – ECAC Hockey weekly Honor Roll (10/18, 2/20)
 Christine Lambert – ECAC Hockey weekly Honor Roll (12/5, 1/16, 2/7)
 Carly Mercer – ECAC Hockey weekly Honor Roll (11/1, 1/16, 2/7)
 Jamie Lee Rattray – Patty Kazmaier Memorial Award nominee, ECAC Hockey Player of the Month (October), ECAC Hockey Player of the Week (12/5), ECAC Hockey weekly Honor Roll (10/4, 10/11, 10/25)
 Jennifer Shields – ECAC Hockey Rookie of the Month (December)
 Danielle Skirrow – ECAC Hockey weekly Honor Roll (12/12)
 Brittany Styner – ECAC Hockey weekly Honor Roll (2/13)
 Hailey Wood – ECAC Hockey weekly Honor Roll (11/14)

References

Clarkson Golden Knights women's ice hockey seasons
Clarkson